Gluphisia is a genus of moths of the family Notodontidae.

Species
Gluphisia avimacula Hudson, 1891
Gluphisia crenata (Esper, 1785) (includes Gluphisia septentrionis as a synonym)
Gluphisia lintneri (Grote, 1877)
Gluphisia oxiana (Djakonov, 1927)
Gluphisia severa H. Edwards, 1886
Gluphisia wrightii H. Edwards, 1886

External links

Notodontidae